Arauca is a municipality and capital city of the Arauca Department of Colombia. Its full name is Villa de Santa Bárbara de Arauca, it is located at N 07° 05′ 25″ - W 70° 45′ 42″. The Municipality of Arauca has a total population of 85,585 (2018 census).

History
The Arauca region was explored by the German conquistador Jorge de la Espira, or Georg von Speyer, in 1536. The early Spanish did not stay because they were on the quest for El Dorado. However, they were later followed by Jesuits and land-grantees who founded the first settlements.

Arauca was founded on December 4, 1780, by Juan Isidro Daboín on the site of an indigenous hamlet of about ten families called Guahibo. Arauca was named after the Arauca River, which now separates it from Venezuela, which river in turn was named for the indigenous people the Arauca. The area is flat and subject to frequent flooding from the river.

At one point, it was the capital of the New Granada Province of Casanare which was much larger than the current Department of Casanare.
In addition, the Villa de Santa Bárbara de Arauca, has been:
 Capital of the Republic, under the revolutionary government, constituted July 16, 1816;
 Capital of the Police District (Comisaría especial) since 1911;
 Capital of the Province (Intendencia Nacional) of Arauca, 1955–1991;
 Oil capital of Colombia since 1986;
 Capital of the Department of Arauca since 1991.

Climate

Demographics

Ethnic Groups

The White and Mestizo people dominate the city making up 92.4% of its population together. Blacks make up 5.9% of the city and Indigenous people make up 1.7% of the city.

Economy

Since its founding, Arauca's primary business has been the raising of cattle, and this is still true.  But increasingly, since 1984 it is the exploitation of nearby petroleum (oil sands) that has provided the bulk of municipal income in recent years. The building of the bridge, Puente José Antonio Páez, connecting it with Venezuela stimulated the economy, as did completion of the highway to Bogotá, known as The Route of the Liberators (La Ruta de los Libertadores).  Arauca is now on the main surface route between Caracas and Bogotá.

Transportation

Santiago Perez Airport

References

External links
 Official website of the Arauca municipality
 Arauca News
 Arauca llanera music

Municipalities of Arauca Department
Populated places established in 1780
Colombia–Venezuela border crossings
Capitals of Colombian departments
1780 establishments in the Spanish Empire